Langinkoski is a rapid on the Kymi river in Kotka, Finland.

Imperial fishing lodge

Alexander III of Russia (who ruled the Grand Duchy of Finland as part of the Russian Empire) had a very small manor or a medium-sized log house built there, between the branches of the Kymi river.  He would take relatively rustic vacations there, along with his family.  His wife the empress Marie Feodorovna (née Dagmar of Denmark) enjoyed cooking while he fished or split wood. The log house is now a museum.

Alexander III and Dagmar had heard about the good salmon fishing at Langinkoski, so in the summer of 1880 they arrived at Langinkoski to watch the salmon fishing. They also took a liking to the beautiful river scenery and promised to return.

Some years later they did return to Langinkoski. They said that they would like to have a little fishing hut on the banks of the river.

The senate of the Grand Duchy of Finland took measures to have a villa built for the sovereign and his family on the very banks of the Langinkoski rapids. The lodge was designed by architect Magnus Schjerfbeck and the interior decorating was planned by architect Jac. Ahrenberg.

The construction of the lodge was begun in the summer of 1888. The imperial couple were so interested in their summer house in Finland that they came to watch the progress of the project. Along with them came their youngest children, grand duke Michael, 10, and grand duchess Olga, 6.             
The interior decorating of the lodge was almost totally designed and manufactured in Finland.

The pieces of furniture in the sitting room were manufactured by local cabinet-makers, the textiles by Tampella in Tampere, the chinaware by Arabia in Helsinki, the axe by Billnäs, the wine and drinking glasses by Karhula Glassworks and the kitchen stove by Högfors; all well-known firms which still exist today, aside from Tampella.                                             
                        
At their Langinkoski lodge the imperial family led a very simple life. The emperor was very fond of children and he took his youngest children for outings in the surroundings. The members of the imperial family used simple clothing and had uncomplicated food to eat.

Empress Marie Feodorovna knew how to cook and at Langinkoski she had an opportunity of devoting herself to that hobby. It is known also that she did not like washing the dishes.

Some years ago a photograph taken at Langinkoski was found in the Russian State Archives in St. Petersburg. The picture shows empress Marie Feodorovna sitting on the kitchen porch busying herself with cooking. The young officer to the right is Grand Duke George, her second youngest son. This probably was his only visit to Langinkoski. He had caught tuberculosis and the doctors had recommended for him to live in a mountain climate. He lived in the Caucasus and died there at the age of 28 years.                                     
                                    
When Finland became independent in 1917 the imperial fishing lodge was taken over by the Finnish government, but it was left without maintenance. Pieces of furniture were removed to unknown destinations and the lodge began to deteriorate.

Private individuals saved the lodge for posterity by establishing an association with the intention of turning the lodge into a museum. Their second attempt to get the government's permission for their project met with success and in 1933 the museum was opened. This very day the association, Langinkoski Museum Society, acts as museum operator under a contract with the government and under the supervision of the National Board of Antiquities.

In the 1920s the beds of the emperor and the empress had been taken away to an unknown place. As a result of many years of detective work by the Museum Society the beds were traced to Kultaranta, the summer residence of the president of Finland.

There they were placed in the guest rooms. In 1956 they were returned to Langinkoski where they can be seen upstairs in the bedroom of the imperial couple."

Attractions 

 Imperial Fishing Lodge. Alexander III and his wife Maria Feodorovna had heard about the rapids, which were rich in salmon. In the summer of 1880, Alexander III went to Langinkoski for the first time to go fishing and he was fascinated by the nature of the region. In 1887 the couple decided to build a fisherman's hut on the banks of the rapids, which was ceremonially opened on July 15, 1889. The two-storey hut, situated on the eastern bank of the river, has retained its original appearance and functioned as a museum.
 The Orthodox Chapel, the oldest building on the territory of the reserve, was created by the monks of the Valaam Monastery 80 years earlier than the imperial hut. The building was open at first, glass windows were installed later.
 The Fishermen's Hut is an authentic fishermen's hut that was built in 1892 for three imperial fishermen by order of Alexander III.
 The "imperial" fishermen's stone. It is known for certain that the Emperor liked to fish with a rod for aspirin, sitting on a large rock on the eastern bank of the rapids. To climb the stone, Alexander III built with his own hands a wooden ladder, which survives to this day.
 Russian trenches of the World War I from 1918. - The fortifications on the eastern bank of the Kymi River, equipped with a system of small arms trenches, machine gun nests and dugouts, were built in 1916. The construction of the fortifications was completed by the end of the war, in 1918. The trenches at Langinkoski are about 1.5 kilometres long and 1.5 metres deep.
 The imperial memorial stone. Two years after the death of Alexander III, the memorial stone was unveiled in Langinkoski in November 1896. There is a plaque on the huge boulder that reads: "Peaceful Alexander III enjoyed quiet here, protected by the local people, from 1888 to 1894. The people of Kymi and Kotka have erected this memorial plaque". During the Civil War in 1918, after which Finland became independent, the memorial stone was shelled, and attempts were made to tear it down. Traces of these events have also been preserved in the reserve as a historical monument.
 An old summer café. The summer coffee pavilion, built back in 1926, sits on a rock at the end of the road Keisarinmajantie, next to the car park.

See also
Langinkoski Church

References

Langinkoski Imperial Fishing Lodge Museum

External links
Panoramic photos

Museums in Kymenlaakso
Royal residences in Finland
Russian monarchy
Historic house museums in Finland